Oleksandr Sydorenko (27 May 1960 – 20 February 2022), also known as Aleksandr Sidorenko, was an individual medley swimmer from the USSR. He won the 400 m individual medley at the 1980 Summer Olympics in Moscow.

Career
Sydorenko won a gold medal at the 1981 European Aquatics Championships in Split, and at the 1982 World Aquatics Championships in Guayaquil in the 200-metre individual medley.

At the 1983 Summer Universiade in Edmonton, he won a silver medal in the 200-metre individual medley. Between 1977 and 1986 he became the USSR champion 20 times.

Sydorenko won the 400 m individual medley at the 1980 Summer Olympics in Moscow.

He worked from 1987 to 2014 as the manager of the water polo team "Ilyichevets." After retirement he worked as a volunteer in the water Polo Federation of the city of Mariupol.

Personal life and death
Sydorenko married the bronze medal-winner of the 1980 Olympic Games, Yelena Kruglova, in 1982. Sydorenko was awarded the Order of Friendship of Peoples (USSR).

Oleksandr Sydorenko died from COVID-19 in Mariupol on 20 February 2022, at the age of 61.

See also 
 World record progression 200 metres medley

References

External links
 Water polo team "Ilyichevets" 
 YouTube heat 400 IM Olympic Games -80
 
  Profile in the Olympic Encyclopedia
  Interview to Alexander in the newspaper 
  Interview to Alexander in the newspaper
  Ru.Wikipedia
 

1960 births
2022 deaths
Sportspeople from Mariupol
Swimmers at the 1980 Summer Olympics
World record setters in swimming
Male medley swimmers
Olympic gold medalists for the Soviet Union
Soviet male swimmers
Olympic swimmers of the Soviet Union
Ukrainian male swimmers
World Aquatics Championships medalists in swimming
European Aquatics Championships medalists in swimming
Honoured Masters of Sport of the USSR
Medalists at the 1980 Summer Olympics
Olympic gold medalists in swimming
Universiade medalists in swimming
Universiade silver medalists for the Soviet Union
Medalists at the 1983 Summer Universiade
Deaths from the COVID-19 pandemic in Ukraine
Laureates of the Diploma of the Verkhovna Rada of Ukraine
Laureates of the Honorary Diploma of the Verkhovna Rada of Ukraine